Mohammad Ibrahim Shtayyeh  (born 17 January 1958) is a Palestinian politician, he is also an academic and economist who became prime minister of the Palestinian National Authority in March 2019. 

He is a member of Fatah who was elected to its Central Committee in the movement’s 2009 and 2016 elections and is aligned with Palestinian Authority President Mahmoud Abbas.

Born in Tell, Nablus in 1958, Shtayyeh was named a minister of Palestinian Economic Council for Development and Reconstruction (PECDAR), a $1.6 billion public investment fund, in 1996. He served as its director of administration and finance from 1994 to 1996. 

Shtayyeh was a member of the Palestinian advance team at the Israeli-Palestinian negotiations in Madrid in 1991 and was a member of the Palestinian negotiation delegation on subsequent occasions. 
He was elected minister of public works and housing for the Palestinian Authority in 2005 and 2008,

Education
Shtayyeh holds a bachelor's degree in business administration and economics from Birzeit University, graduating in 1981.  He then attended the Institute for Development Studies at the University of Sussex in Brighton, United Kingdom, receiving his doctorate in economic development in 1989.

Career 
Shtayyeh served as a professor of economic development from 1989 to 1991 at Birzeit University.  He later became dean of student affairs there until 1993.  

From 1995 until 1998, Shtayyeh held the position of Secretary-General of the Central Elections Commission of Palestine.  Since 2005, Shtayyeh has been the Palestinian governor for the Islamic Bank. From 2005–2006 and then again from 2008–2010, he was the minister of public works and housing.

Elections Commission 

As Secretary-General of the Central Elections Commission of Palestine, he negotiated an agreement with Israel in order to cooperate in the conduct of Palestinian presidential and legislative elections.

Prime Minister of Palestine 
Since becoming prime minister of Palestine in April 2019, he has pursued peace negotiations between Hamas, which de facto controls the Gaza Strip, and the  Palestinian central government in the West Bank.

When heads of state from the 55-member African Union met for a two-day summit on 5 February 2022, Mohammed Shtayyeh urged the African Union to remove Israel's observer status.

Boards and Commissions 

 President, Board of Trustees, Arab American University, Jenin
 Member, Board of Trustees, Al-Quds University, Jerusalem
 Member, Board of Trustees, Al Najah University, Nablus
 Member, Board of Palestinian Academy for Security Sciences of Alistiqlal University 
 Member, Board of Trustees of Middle East Nonviolence Association
 Member, Palestinian Development Fund
 Member, National Committee for Voluntary Work
 Founding member, Palestine Housing Council
 President, Board of Palestinian Economists Association
 Advisory Board, Information and Communication Committee, Office of the President 
 Head, Syria Relief Campaign 2012

Publications 

 Al Mokhtasar Fi Tareekh Falastin, Dar Al Shouk Beirut, 2015 (in Arabic )
 A Jerusalem Developmental Vision, PECDAR, 2010.
 The Encyclopedia of Palestinian Terms and Concepts, Palestinian Center for Regional Studies, 2009.
 Ikleel Men Shawk (Wreath of Thorns), Arab Scientific Publishers. Beirut, 2009. Collection of short stories.
 Housing Policy in Palestine, Ministry of Public Works & Housing, Ramallah, 2006.
 Israel's Disengagement from the Gaza Strip, (with Tim Sheehi & Eyad Ennab), PECDAR, 2006.
 Palestine: Country Profile, PECDAR, 2006.
 The Future of the Jewish Settlements, Palestinian Center for Regional Studies, Al-Bireh, 2000.
 Israel in the Region: Conflict, Hegemony, or Cooperation, Palestinian Center for Regional Studies,  Al-Bireh, 1998.
 Private-Sector Credits: Donor Assistance, PECDAR, Jerusalem, 1998.
 The Politics of the Middle East Development Bank, Palestinian Center for Regional Studies, Al-Bireh, 1998.
 Palestine: Building the Foundation of Economic Growth, PECDAR, 1st ed. 1987 and 2nd ed. 1998

Awards 
 "Chevalier de l'Ordre National du Mérite", awarded by the President of France, Jacques Chirac, May 1999.
 The Samaritan Medal, awarded by the Samaritan Foundation, May 2009.

References

External links 

 The National Institute for Administration (NIA) 
 Islamic Development Bank
 9th Cabinet of Palestine State 
 Alquds University  
 Washington post : Palestinian president Mahmoud Abbas declares diplomatic war on Israel 
  BBC Interview  2009  

Living people
1958 births
Fatah members
Government ministers of the Palestinian National Authority
Prime Ministers of Palestine
Palestinian politicians
Members of the Palestinian Central Council
People from Tell, Nablus
Palestinian economists
Alumni of the University of Sussex
Birzeit University alumni
Academic staff of Birzeit University
Government ministers of the State of Palestine
Central Committee of Fatah members
Palestinian Sunni Muslims